Jamides aritai is a butterfly of the family Lycaenidae. Forewing length: 15–19 mm. It is found in the Philippines, Sulawesi and northern and central Maluku. Two subspecies are described: nominotypical subspecies J. r. aritai is distributed through the Philippines, Sulawesi and Morotai in northern Maluku. Subspecies J. r. sabina is in central Maluku (Buru, Ceram and Ambon).

Subspecies
 Jamides aritai aritai H. Hayashi, [1977] 
 Jamides aritai sabina Rawlins, Cassidy, et al., 2014

References

 Hayashi, Hisakazu, 1977: New subspecies of Jamides and Udara from Palawan (Lepidoptera: Lycaenidae). Tyo-to-Ga. 27 (4): 151-155.
 Cassidy, Alan C., 2013: On some type specimens of Lycaenidae from South East Asia (Lepidoptera). Nachrichten des Entomologischen Vereins Apollo, N.F. 34 (3): 137-144.
 Rawlins, A., Cassidy, Alan C., and et al., 2014: An illustrated and annotated checklist of Jamides Hübner, 1819, taxa occurring in the Indonesian provinces of Northern Maluku and Maluku (Lepidoptera: Lycaenidae). Nachrichten des Entomologischen Vereins Apollo, N.F. 35 (1/2): 5-39.

Jamides
Butterflies described in 1977